Ferma is a rural locality (a settlement) and the administrative center of Dvurechenskoye Rural Settlement, Permsky District, Perm Krai, Russia. The population was 3,786 as of 2010. There are 30 streets.

Geography 
Ferma is located on the Mulyanka River, 16 km south of Perm (the district's administrative centre) by road. Vashury is the nearest rural locality.

References 

Rural localities in Permsky District